By Whose Hand? is a lost 1927 American silent crime drama film directed by Walter Lang and released by Columbia Pictures. Filmed before as a silent directed by James Durkin in 1916. An early talkie remake was made in 1932 by Benjamin Stoloff.

Cast
 Ricardo Cortez as Agent X-9
 Eugenia Gilbert as Peg Hewlett
 Jack Baston as Sidney (as J. Thornton Baaston)
 Tom Dugan as Rollins
 Blue Washington as Eli
 Lillian Leighton as Silly McShane
 William Scott as 'Society Charlie'
 John Steppling as Claridge
 De Sacia Mooers as Tex

References

External links

1927 films
1927 crime drama films
American crime drama films
American silent feature films
American black-and-white films
Films directed by Walter Lang
Columbia Pictures films
Lost American films
1920s English-language films
1920s American films
Silent American drama films